Roelant is a Dutch male given name. Notable people with the name include:

 Roelant Oltmans (born 1954), Dutch field hockey coach
 Roelant Roghman (1627–1692), Dutch painter, sketcher and engraver
 Roelant Savery (1576–1639), Dutch painter

Dutch masculine given names